Lionetti is an Italian surname. Notable people with the surname include:

Edoardo Lionetti (1862–1912), Italian sculptor
Pia Lionetti (born 1987), Italian archer

See also
Leonetti

Italian-language surnames